Toy Story is a 1995 American computer-animated comedy film directed by John Lasseter (in his feature directorial debut), produced by Pixar Animation Studios and released by Walt Disney Pictures. The first installment in the  Toy Story franchise, it was the first entirely computer-animated feature film, as well as the first feature film from Pixar. It was written by Joss Whedon, Andrew Stanton, Joel Cohen, and Alec Sokolow from a story by Lasseter, Stanton, Pete Docter, and Joe Ranft. The film features music by Randy Newman, was produced by Bonnie Arnold and Ralph Guggenheim, and was executive-produced by Steve Jobs and Edwin Catmull. The film features the voices of Tom Hanks, Tim Allen, Don Rickles, Jim Varney, Wallace Shawn, John Ratzenberger, Annie Potts, R. Lee Ermey, John Morris, Laurie Metcalf, and Erik von Detten.

Taking place in a world where toys come to life when humans are not present, the plot of Toy Story focuses on the relationship between an old-fashioned pull-string cowboy doll named Woody and a modern space cadet action figure, Buzz Lightyear, as Woody develops jealousy towards Buzz when he becomes their owner Andy's favorite toy.

Following the success of Tin Toy, a short film that was released in 1988, Pixar was approached by Disney to produce a computer-animated feature film that was told from a small toy's perspective. Lasseter, Stanton, and Docter wrote early story treatments, which were rejected by Disney, who wanted the film's tone to be "edgier". After several disastrous story reels, production was halted and the script was rewritten to better reflect the tone and theme Pixar desired: "toys deeply want children to play with them, and ... this desire drives their hopes, fears, and actions". The studio, then consisting of a relatively small number of employees, produced Toy Story under only minor financial constraints.

Toy Story premiered at the El Capitan Theatre in Los Angeles, California, United States, on November 19, 1995, and was released in theaters in North America on November 22 of that year. It was the highest-grossing film during its opening weekend, eventually grossing over $373 million worldwide, making it the second highest-grossing film of 1995. The film received critical acclaim, and holds a  approval rating on Rotten Tomatoes. It was praised for the technical innovation of the 3D animation, screenplay, musical score, and vocal performances (particularly Hanks and Allen); it is considered by many to be one of the best animated films ever made. The film received three Academy Award nominations (Best Original Screenplay (the first animated film to be nominated for this award), Best Original Song for "You've Got a Friend in Me", and Best Original Score) as well as honoring a non-competitive Special Achievement Academy Award.

In 2005, Toy Story was selected for preservation in the United States National Film Registry by the Library of Congress as being "culturally, historically, or aesthetically significant", one of seven films designated in its first year of eligibility. The success of Toy Story launched a multimedia franchise and a series of three sequels, starting with Toy Story 2 (1999). The film also had a theatrical 3D re-release in 2009 as a part of a double feature with the second film.
A spin-off, Lightyear, was released in 2022, with Chris Evans voicing the in-universe human Buzz Lightyear who inspired the action figure toyline in the Toy Story films.

Plot 

In a world where toys come to life in the absence of humans, a group of toys is preparing to move into a new house with their owner, Andy Davis, his sister, Molly, and their single mother. The toys become uneasy when Andy has his birthday party a week early; pullstring cowboy doll Sheriff Woody, Andy's favorite toy and their leader, sends Sarge and his green army men to spy on the gift-opening with a baby monitor in hopes of calming the others. The other toys which include Mr. Potato Head, Slinky Dog,  Rex (a toy dinosaur),  Hamm (a piggy bank), and Bo Peep (a porcelain doll) are relieved when Andy receives nothing that could replace them. Andy then receives a last-minute surprise gift from his mother: A Buzz Lightyear action figure, who believes he is an actual space ranger. Buzz impresses the other toys with his various features, and becomes Andy's new favorite toy, making Woody jealous.

Two days before the move, Andy's family plans for a dinner at Pizza Planet, where Andy is allowed to bring along only one toy. To ensure Andy chooses him and not Buzz, Woody tries to use the radio-controlled car RC to knock Buzz behind the dresser, but accidentally knocks him out a window instead. Most of the other toys suspect that Woody intentionally tried to kill Buzz, but Andy arrives and takes Woody before they can exact revenge. A furious Buzz stows away in the car, and confronts Woody when the car stops at a gas station on the way to Pizza Planet. The two fight, fall out of the car, and are left behind.

After a further argument, the two hitch a ride on a Pizza Planet delivery truck and sneak into the restaurant. However, Buzz mistakes a claw crane full of Little Green Men for a spaceship, and enters it, with Woody in pursuit. Andy's sadistic next-door neighbor Sid Phillips spots and wins the two, along with a Little Green Man, and takes them to his house. Woody and Buzz encounter Sid's vicious Bull Terrier Scud and some "mutant" toys made from parts of other toys Sid has destroyed.

As Woody tries to find an escape route, Buzz is shocked to see a Buzz Lightyear action figure television commercial that proves that he is indeed just a toy. In denial, he attempts to fly, but fails, breaking his arm, sending him into a depression. After the mutant toys fix Buzz, Sid returns and tapes Buzz to a rocket, intending to blow him up, but he is forced to wait until the next morning due to bad weather. Woody helps Buzz realize that his purpose is making Andy happy, while admitting his own insecurities. This conversation restores Buzz's resolve, and the two work to get out of Sid's house. Just as Sid takes Buzz out to attempt to launch him, Woody rallies the mutant toys to frighten Sid into never harming toys again, freeing him and Buzz.

Woody and Buzz pursue Andy's moving truck, but Scud sees them and gives chase, biting Woody's ankle. Buzz fights off Scud, while Woody climbs into the truck and pushes RC out, using him to distract Scud and rescue Buzz. The other toys, thinking Woody is now trying to get rid of RC, toss Woody back into the street. Having escaped Scud, Buzz and Woody pursue the truck on RC, and the other toys spot them coming and realize their error. During the chase, RC's batteries run out, forcing Woody to light the rocket still strapped to Buzz. As they launch towards the truck, they become airborne, and Woody drops RC into the truck. Buzz opens his wings to sever the tape just before the rocket explodes; he and Woody glide over the truck and fall through the sunroof of Andy's car, landing safely beside Andy.

At Christmas, in the new house, Sarge and his men spy on the gift-opening again while the other toys wait. Mr. Potato Head is delighted when Molly gets a Mrs. Potato Head, and Woody and Buzz jokingly ponder what gift could be "worse" than Buzz, only to nervously smile at each other when Andy gets a dachshund puppy.

Voice cast 

 Tom Hanks as Woody, a pullstring cowboy doll who is Andy's favorite toy.
 Tim Allen as Buzz Lightyear, a Space Ranger action figure, Andy’s second favorite toy, and Woody's rival, who later becomes his friend.
 Don Rickles as Mr. Potato Head, a cynical potato-shaped doll with put-together pieces on his body.
 Jim Varney as Slinky Dog, a dachshund slinky toy.
 Wallace Shawn as Rex, a nervous green Tyrannosaurus figurine.
 John Ratzenberger as Hamm, a smart-talking piggy bank.
 Annie Potts as Bo Peep, a porcelain shepherdess doll and Woody's love interest.
 John Morris as Andy Davis, the toys' owner.
 Erik von Detten as Sid Phillips, Andy's next-door neighbor, who destroys toys for fun.
 Laurie Metcalf as Mrs. Davis, Andy and Molly's single mother.
 R. Lee Ermey as Sergeant, the leader of a large troop of plastic green army men.
 Sarah Freeman as Hannah Phillips, Sid's younger sister.
 Penn Jillette as the Buzz Lightyear TV commercial announcer.

Production

Development 
John Lasseter's first experience with computer animation was during his work as an animator at Walt Disney Feature Animation, when two of his friends showed him the light-cycle scene from Tron. It was an eye-opening experience that awakened Lasseter to the possibilities offered by the new medium of computer-generated animation. Lasseter tried to pitch The Brave Little Toaster as a fully computer-animated film to Disney, but the idea was rejected and Lasseter was fired. He then went on to work at Lucasfilm and in 1986, he became a founding member of Pixar. In 1986, Pixar was purchased by entrepreneur and Apple Inc. co-founder Steve Jobs. At Pixar, Lasseter created short, computer-animated films to show off the Pixar Image Computer's capabilities. In 1988, Lasseter produced the short film, Tin Toy, which was told from the perspective of a toy, referencing Lasseter's love of classic toys. Tin Toy won the 1989 Academy Award for Best Animated Short Film, the first computer-generated film to do so.

Tin Toy gained Disney's attention, and the new team at The Walt Disney Company, CEO Michael Eisner and chairman Jeffrey Katzenberg in the film division, sought to get Lasseter to come back. Lasseter, grateful for Jobs' faith in him, felt compelled to stay with Pixar, telling co-founder Ed Catmull, "I can go to Disney and be a director, or I can stay here and make history." Katzenberg realized he could not lure Lasseter back to Disney and therefore set plans into motion to ink a production deal with Pixar to produce a film.  Disney had always made all their movies in-house and refused to change this. But when Tim Burton, who used to work at Disney, wanted to buy back the rights to The Nightmare Before Christmas, Disney struck a deal allowing him to make it as a Disney film outside the studio. This allowed Pixar to make their movies outside Disney.

Both sides were willing. Catmull and fellow Pixar co-founder Alvy Ray Smith had long wanted to produce a computer-animated feature, but only by the early 1990s were the computers cheap and powerful enough to make this possible. In addition, Disney had licensed Pixar's Computer Animation Production System (CAPS), and that made it the largest customer for Pixar's computers. Jobs made it apparent to Katzenberg that although Disney was happy with Pixar, it was not the other way around: "We want to do a film with you," said Jobs. "That would make us happy."

Catmull, Smith, and head of animation Ralph Guggenheim met with Walt Disney Feature Animation president Peter Schneider in the summer of 1990 to discuss making a feature film, but they found the atmosphere to be puzzling and contentious. They later learned that while Katzenberg was pushing the idea of working with Pixar, Schneider did not want to bring in a non-Disney animation studio. Katzenberg arranged to meet directly with the Pixar contingent, this time including Lasseter and Jobs. The Pixar team proposed a Christmas television special, A Tin Toy Christmas, as a first step, but Katzenberg countered that as long as they were gearing up to transition from 30-second commercials to a half-hour special, they might as well go all the way and make a feature-length film. Katzenberg also made it clear that he was only working with Pixar to get access to Lasseter's talents  and that the Pixar team would be signing up to work with a self-described "tyrant" and micro-manager, but invited them to talk with Disney's animators and get their opinions on working under him. Lasseter was impressed with what he heard, and the two companies began negotiations, although they disagreed on key points including whether Disney would get the rights to Pixar's animation technology or whether Pixar would retain partial ownership of the films, characters, and home video and sequel rights. As Pixar was nearing bankruptcy and desperate for funds, they settled on a deal that would allow Disney to have complete ownership and control of the films and characters, including the rights to make sequels without Pixar's involvement, while Pixar would get approximately 12.5% of ticket sales. These early negotiations became a point of contention between Jobs and Eisner for many years.

An agreement to produce a feature film based on Tin Toy with a working title of Toy Story was finalized, and production began soon thereafter.

Writing 
Originally, Toy Story was going to feature "Tinny", the wind-up one-man band toy from the Tin Toy short film, along with "the dummy", a ventriloquist's dummy. While the film's premise was still about toys' desire to be played with by children, the rest of the film's script, which involved Tinny being left behind at a gas station, meeting up with the dummy, and having a series of adventures before finding their way into a kindergarten classroom where they can be played with every day, was quite different. Katzenberg was unhappy with the treatment drafted by Lasseter, Andrew Stanton, and Pete Docter, as the two character's motivations were too similar. Instead, he encouraged them to write it as a buddy film, giving the two main characters contrasting personalities, and having them only become friends after being forced to work together. Lasseter, Stanton, and Docter delivered a revised treatment in September 1991 that more closely resembles the final version of the film: Tinny replaces the ventriloquist dummy as a child's favorite toy, their bickering causes them to be left behind at a gas station, they almost catch up to the family at a pizza restaurant, they have to escape a kid that mutilates toys, and the movie ends with a chase scene as the two toys try to catch up to the family's moving van.

The script went through many changes before the final version of it. Lasseter decided Tinny was "too antiquated"; the character was first changed to a military action figure and was then given a space theme. Tinny's name changed to Lunar Larry, then Tempus from Morph, and eventually Buzz Lightyear (after astronaut Buzz Aldrin). Lightyear's design was modeled on the suits worn by Apollo astronauts as well as G.I. Joe action figures. Also, the green and purple color scheme on Lightyear's suit was inspired by Lasseter and his wife, Nancy, whose favorite colors are green and purple, respectively. Woody was inspired by a Casper the Friendly Ghost doll that Lasseter had when he was a child; he was a ventriloquist's dummy with a pull-string (hence the name "Woody"). This was until character designer Bud Luckey suggested that Woody could be changed to a cowboy ventriloquist dummy. Lasseter liked the contrast between the Western and the science fiction genres and the character immediately changed. Eventually, all of the ventriloquist dummy aspects of the character were deleted as the dummy looked "sneaky and mean". However they kept the name "Woody" to pay homage to the Western actor Woody Strode. The story department drew inspiration from films such as Midnight Run and The Odd Couple, and Lasseter screened Hayao Miyazaki's Castle in the Sky for further influence.

Since Toy Storys script writers had little experience with feature films, they attended a seminar given by screenwriter Robert McKee. They were inspired by his guidance, based on Aristotle's Poetics, that the main character in a story should be defined by how they react to the obstacles they face, and that it is those obstacles that make characters interesting. Disney also appointed the duo Joel Cohen and Alec Sokolow and, later, Joss Whedon to help develop the script. Whedon thought that while the script did not work, it had "a great structure". He added the character of Rex and sought a pivotal role for a Barbie doll; the latter transformed into Bo Peep as Mattel would not license the character. Whedon also re-visioned Buzz Lightyear from being a dim-witted but cheerful and self-aware character to an action figure who isn't aware that he's a toy—an epiphany that transformed the film. A brainstorming session with members of Disney Animation's creative team resulted in the addition of the three-eyed squeaky toy aliens.

Casting 
Katzenberg approved the script on January 19, 1993, at which point voice casting began.

Paul Newman, who subsequently accepted the role of Doc Hudson in another Pixar film, Cars, which was released in 2006, was considered for the role of Woody. Robin Williams and Clint Eastwood were also considered for the role. Lasseter always wanted Tom Hanks to play the character of Woody. Lasseter claimed that Hanks "has the ability to take emotions and make them appealing. Even if the character, like the one in A League of Their Own, is down-and-out and despicable." To gauge how an actor's voice might fit with a character, Lasseter borrowed a common Disney technique: animate a vocal monologue from a well-established actor to meld the actor's voice with the appearance or actions of the animated character. This early test footage, using Hanks' voice from Turner & Hooch, convinced Hanks to sign on to the film.

Billy Crystal was approached to play Buzz, and was given his own monologue, utilizing dialogue from When Harry Met Sally. However, he turned down the role, believing the film would be unsuccessful due to its animation. Crystal regretted this upon seeing the film; he subsequently accepted the role of Mike Wazowski in another Pixar film, Monsters, Inc., which was released in 2001. In addition to Crystal, Bill Murray, Chevy Chase and Jim Carrey, along with a number of other actors, including Jason Alexander, Dan Aykroyd, Matthew Broderick, Kevin Costner, Michael J. Fox, Richard Gere, David Hasselhoff, Michael Keaton (who later voiced Ken in Toy Story 3), Wayne Knight (who later voiced Al in Toy Story 2), Bill Paxton, Dennis Quaid, Kurt Russell, Adam Sandler and John Travolta, were also considered for the role of Buzz. Lasseter took the role to Tim Allen, who was appearing in Disney's Home Improvement, and he accepted. Crystal later stated in an interview that he would not have been right as Buzz, and that Allen was "fantastic" in the role. Before Wallace Shawn and Jim Varney were cast as Rex and Slinky Dog, Rick Moranis and John Cleese were originally considered for the roles.

To cast Andy, Pixar held an open call for young male actors to bring a toy with them. Morris brought multiple toys, specifically 45 X-Men figures, contrary to the instructions of bringing just one, and Pixar re-acted to his dumping of the toys with laughter.

Toy Story was both Hanks's and Allen's first animated film, and they recorded their lines together to make their characters' chemistry and interactions realistic.

Production shutdown 
Every couple of weeks, Lasseter and his team showed Disney their latest storyboards or footage. Disney was impressed by Pixar's technical innovation, but less-so of the plot. Katzenberg discarded most of Pixar's script ideas, giving his own extensive notes. Katzenberg primarily wanted to add "more edginess" to the two main characters, as Disney wanted Toy Story to appeal to both children and adults, and they asked for adult references to be added to the film. The characters ended up being stripped of their charm, with Hanks, while recording Woody's dialogue for the story reels, complaining that the character had been made into a "real jerk". Pixar screened the first half of the film for Disney executives on November 19, 1993—an event they later dubbed the "Black Friday Incident". The results were disastrous, and Disney's head of feature animation, Peter Schneider, halted production. Katzenberg asked colleague Thomas Schumacher why the reels were bad, to which Schumacher answered, "Because it's not their movie anymore; it's completely not the movie that John set out to make."

Lasseter was embarrassed by the current state of the film, later recalling, "It was a story filled with the most unhappy, mean characters that I've ever seen." Katzenberg allowed him to take the script back to Pixar for rewrites, and the production crew shifted to television commercials while the head writers worked out a new script, being funded personally by Jobs until Disney resumed production. Although Lasseter attempted to keep morale high by remaining outwardly buoyant, the production shutdown was "a very scary time", recalled story department manager BZ Petroff. Schneider appealed directly to Eisner to cancel the project altogether. Stanton and the other story artists worked to quickly produce new script pages, with help from consultants such as Whedon, and the revisions were completed in two weeks as promised.

Pixar's script rewrites took three months, and saw Woody transformed from a tyrant to a wise leader. It also included a more adult-oriented staff meeting amongst the toys rather than the juvenile group discussion that had existed in earlier drafts. Buzz Lightyear's character was also changed "to make it more clear to the audience that he genuinely doesn't know he's a toy". Katzenberg and Schneider resumed production with the new script by February 1994, and the voice actors returned one month later to record their new lines. The crew grew from 24 people to 110, and now included 27 animators and 22 technical directors. In comparison, The Lion King, released in 1994, required a budget of $45 million and a staff of 800. In the early budgeting process, Jobs was eager to produce the film as efficiently as possible, impressing Katzenberg with his focus on cost-cutting. However, the $17 million production budget was no longer going to be sufficient, and Jobs demanded more funds from Disney to compensate them for the time lost in rewrites based on Katzenberg's notes. Catmull was able to reach a compromise on a new budget, but the incident led Jobs to rethink their deal with Disney.

Animation 

Recruiting animators for Toy Story was brisk; the magnet for talent was not mediocre pay but the allure of taking part in the first computer-animated feature. Lasseter said of the challenges of computer animation, "We had to make things look more organic. Every leaf and blade of grass had to be created. We had to give the world a sense of history. So the doors are banged up, the floors have scuffs." The film began with animated storyboards to guide the animators in developing the characters. 27 animators worked on the film, using 400 computer models to animate the characters. Each character was first either created out of clay or modeled from a computer-drawn diagram before reaching the computer-animated design. Once the animators had a model, its articulation and motion controls were coded; this allowed each character to move in a variety of ways, such as talking, walking, or jumping. Out of all of the characters, Woody was the most complex, as he required 723 motion controls, including 212 for his face and 58 for his mouth. The first piece of animation, a 30-second test, was delivered to Disney in June 1992, when the company requested a sample of what the film would look like. Lasseter wanted to impress Disney with several things in the test that could not be done in traditional, hand-drawn animation, such as Woody's yellow plaid shirt with red stripes, the reflections in Buzz's helmet and the decals on his spacesuit, or Venetian blind shadows falling across Andy's room.

There were eight teams that were responsible for different aspects of all of the shots. The art department was responsible for determining the overall color and lighting scheme. The layout department was responsible for determining the position of all elements of the shot, as well as programming the virtual camera's position and movements. The animation department created the movements of the characters, generally with one animator being assigned to animate an entire shot, but occasionally with each character having its own animator. The shading team used Pixar's RenderMan software to assign surface textures and reflectivity properties to objects. The lighting team placed global, spot, and flood lighting within the scenes. The "Render Farm" used Sun Microsystems computers, running around the clock, to produce the final frames of the film. The camera team recorded the finished frames, which had been rendered at a resolution of 1536 by 922, onto film stock. Finally, Skywalker Sound mixed sound effects, the musical score, and the dialogue to create the audio for the film.

In order to make the film feel as realistic as possible, the layout department, led by Craig Good, avoided the sweeping camera shots popular in computer animation at the time, and instead focused on emulating what would have been possible had the film been shot in live-action with real film cameras. The animation department, led by Rich Quade and Ash Brannon, used Pixar's Menv software to hand pose the characters at key frames based on videotape of the actors recording their lines, and let the software do the inbetweening. To sync the characters' mouths and facial expressions to the actors' recorded voices, animators spent a week per eight seconds of animation, as Lasseter felt that automatic lip syncing would not properly convey a character's emotions. The shading team, led by Tom Porter, used scans of real objects, as well as textures drawn by artists and created with procedural generation algorithms, to "dress" the objects in the film.

The film required 800,000 machine hours and 114,240 frames of animation in total, divided between 1,561 shots that totaled over 77 minutes. Pixar was able to render less than 30 seconds of the film per day.

Music 

Lasseter did not want to make Toy Story into a musical, as he felt that it would make the film feel less genuine. Whedon later agreed, saying "It would have been a really bad musical because it's a buddy movie. It's about people who won't admit what they want, much less sing about it. ... Buddy movies are about sublimating, punching an arm, 'I hate you.' It's not about open emotion." However, Disney preferred to make it a musical, as they had had much success with incorporating Broadway-style musical numbers into their animated films, and encouraged Pixar to do the same. As a compromise, although the characters would not sing, the movie would feature non-diegetic songs as background music. Randy Newman was hired, and composed three original songs for the film. The film's signature song "You've Got a Friend in Me", was written in one day.

On Newman, Lasseter said, "His songs are touching, witty, and satirical, and he would deliver the emotional underpinning for every scene." The soundtrack for Toy Story was produced by Walt Disney Records and was released on November 22, 1995, the week of the film's release.

Editing and pre-release 
Editors, including Lee Unkrich, worked on Toy Story up until the September 1995 deadline to deliver a final cut for scoring and sound design. According to Unkrich, a scene removed from the original final edit featured Sid torturing Buzz and Woody violently at his house; Unkrich decided to cut right into the scene where Sid is interrogating Woody because the film's creators thought the audience would love Buzz and Woody by that point. Another scene, in which Woody tried to get Buzz's attention when he was stuck in the box crate, was shortened because the creators felt it would lose the energy of the film. A test screening in July 1995 received encouraging responses from the audience, but the film was not rated as highly as had been hoped, leading to another last-minute round of edits. Eisner, who attended the screening, suggested that the final shot of the film should be of both Woody and Buzz, leading to the film's final shot of the two worried about the arrival of Andy's new puppy.

Crew members had difficulty analysing the film's quality due to footage being in scattered pieces. Some animators felt the film would be a significant disappointment commercially but felt animators and animation fans would find it interesting. Schneider had grown optimistic about the film as it neared completion, and he announced a United States release date of November, coinciding with Thanksgiving weekend and the start of the winter holiday season.

Sources indicate that Jobs lacked confidence in the film during its production, and had been exploring the possibility of selling Pixar to companies such as Hallmark Cards and Microsoft. However, as the film progressed, Jobs, like Schneider, became increasingly passionate about the film and the transformative nature of what Pixar might be able to accomplish. Eager for Pixar to have the funds necessary to negotiate with Disney as an equal partner, and optimistic about the impact the finished film would have, Jobs decided that he would schedule an initial public offering (IPO) of Pixar just a week after the film's November release.

Release 

Both Disney and Pixar held separate premiers for Toy Story, with Disney holding theirs at their flagship El Capitan Theatre in Los Angeles on November 19, 1995, and Pixar holding theirs the following night at the Regency Center in San Francisco. According to David Price's 2008 book The Pixar Touch, the film deeply resonated with audiences, with even the adults being noticeably moved by the film.

The theatrical release of the film was preceded by either the Roger Rabbit short Roller Coaster Rabbit or the early Pixar short The Adventures of André and Wally B.. In addition to showing at the El Capitan, where tickets included admission to the Totally Toy Story funhouse that Disney had built in the Hollywood Masonic Temple next door, the film opened on 2,281 screens on the 22nd and later expanded to 2,574.

The film was also shown at the Berlin International Film Festival out of competition from February 15 to 26, 1996. Elsewhere, the film opened in March 1996.

Marketing 
Marketing for Toy Story included $20 million spent by Disney for advertising as well as advertisers such as Burger King, PepsiCo, Coca-Cola, and Payless ShoeSource paying $125 million in promotions for the film. Marketing consultant Al Ries reflected on the promotion: "This will be a killer deal. How can a kid, sitting through a one-and-a-half-hour movie with an army of recognizable toy characters, not want to own one?" Despite this, Disney Consumer Products was slow to see the potential of Toy Story. When the Thanksgiving release date was announced in January 1995, many toy companies were accustomed to having eighteen months to two years of lead time and passed on the project. Disney shopped the film at the Toy Fair trade show in February 1995, where only the small Canadian company Thinkway Toys, was interested in licensing the toy rights for the Toy Story characters. Disney promoted the film by inserting its trailer into the home-video re-release of Cinderella, showing a behind-the-scenes documentary on the Disney Channel, and incorporating the characters into a parade at the Disney-MGM Studios theme park in Florida.

It was screenwriter Joss Whedon's idea to incorporate Barbie as a character who could rescue Woody and Buzz in Toy Storys final act. The idea was dropped after Mattel objected and refused to license the toy. Producer Ralph Guggenheim claimed that Mattel did not allow the use of the toy as "They [Mattel] philosophically felt girls who play with Barbie dolls are projecting their personalities onto the doll. If you give the doll a voice and animate it, you're creating a persona for it that might not be every little girl's dream and desire." Hasbro likewise refused to license G.I. Joe (mainly because Sid was going to blow one up, prompting the filmmakers to instead use a fictional toy, Combat Carl), but they did license Mr. Potato Head. The only toy in the film that was not in production was Slinky Dog, which had been discontinued since the 1970s. When designs for Slinky were sent to Betty James (Richard James's wife) she said that Pixar had improved the toy and that it was "cuter" than the original.

3-D re-release 
On October 2, 2009, Toy Story was re-released in Disney Digital 3-D. The film was also released with Toy Story 2 as a double feature for a two-week run which was extended due to its success. In addition, the film's second sequel, Toy Story 3, was also released in the 3-D format. Lasseter commented on the new 3-D re-release:
The Toy Story films and characters will always hold a very special place in our hearts and we're so excited to be bringing this landmark film back for audiences to enjoy in a whole new way thanks to the latest in 3-D technology. With Toy Story 3 shaping up to be another great adventure for Buzz, Woody, and the gang from Andy's room, we thought it would be great to let audiences experience the first two films all over again and in a brand new way.

Translating the film into 3-D involved revisiting the original computer data and virtually placing a second camera into each scene, creating left eye and right eye views needed to achieve the perception of depth. Unique to computer animation, Lasseter referred to this process as "digital archaeology". The process took four months, as well as an additional six months for the two films to add the 3-D. The lead stereographer Bob Whitehill oversaw this process and sought to achieve an effect that affected the emotional storytelling of the film:

When I would look at the films as a whole, I would search for story reasons to use 3-D in different ways. In Toy Story, for instance, when the toys were alone in their world, I wanted it to feel consistent with a safer world. And when they went out to the human world, that's when I really blew out the 3-D to make it feel dangerous and deep and overwhelming.

Unlike other countries, the United Kingdom received the films in 3-D as separate releases. Toy Story was released on October 2, 2009. Toy Story 2 was instead released January 22, 2010. The re-release performed well at the box office, opening with $12,500,000 in its opening weekend, placing at the third position after Zombieland and Cloudy with a Chance of Meatballs. The double feature grossed $30.7 million in its five-week release.

Home media 
Toy Story was released by Walt Disney Home Video on VHS and LaserDisc in the United States and Canada on October 29, 1996, with no bonus material. Within the first few weeks of this release, VHS rentals and sales totaled $5.1 million, ranking Toy Story as the  1 video, beating out Twister. Over 21.5 million VHS copies were sold during the first year. A deluxe edition widescreen LaserDisc 4-disc box set was released on December 18, 1996. This THX certified LaserDisc release features bonus material, such as the history and development of characters, storyboards and story reels, abandoned concepts and characters, outtakes, deleted animation and trailers. On January 11, 2000, the film was re-released on VHS, but this time as the first video to be part of the Walt Disney Gold Classic Collection with the bonus short film Tin Toy. This release sold two million copies.

Toy Story was released for the first time on DVD on October 17, 2000, in a two-pack with its first sequel Toy Story 2. The same day, a 3-disc "Ultimate Toy Box" set was released, featuring Toy Story, Toy Story 2, and the third disc of bonus materials. The twin-pack release was later released individually on March 20, 2001. The DVD two-pack, the Ultimate Toy Box set, the Gold Classic Collection VHS and DVD, and the original DVD were all put in the Disney Vault on May 1, 2003. On September 6, 2005, a 2-disc "10th Anniversary Edition" was released featuring much of the bonus material from the "Ultimate Toy Box", including a retrospective special with John Lasseter and a brand new DTS sound mix. This DVD went back in the Disney Vault on January 31, 2009, along with Toy Story 2. The 10th Anniversary release was the last version of Toy Story to be released before being taken out of the Disney Vault lineup along with Toy Story 2. Also on September 6, 2005, a UMD of Toy Story featuring some deleted scenes, a filmmakers' reflect, and a new "Legacy of Toy Story" was released for the Sony PlayStation Portable.

Toy Story was available for the first time on Blu-ray in a Special Edition Combo Pack that included two discs, the Blu-ray, and the DVD versions of the film. This combo-edition was released by Walt Disney Studios Home Entertainment on March 23, 2010, along with its sequel. There was a DVD-only re-release on May 11, 2010. Another "Ultimate Toy Box", packaging the Combo Pack with those of both sequels, became available on November 2, 2010. On November 1, 2011, the first three Toy Story films were re-released all together, each as a DVD/Blu-ray/Blu-ray 3D/Digital Copy combo pack (four discs each for the first two films, and five for the third film). They were also released on Blu-ray 3D in a complete trilogy box set. The film had a re-release on 4K ULTRA HD Blu-ray on June 4, 2019.

Reception

Box office 
Before the film's release, executive producer and Apple Inc. co-founder Steve Jobs stated "If Toy Story is a modest hit—say $75 million at the box office, we'll [Pixar and Disney] both break even. If it gets $100 million, we'll both make money. But if it's a real blockbuster and earns $200 million or so at the box office, we'll make good money, and Disney will make a lot of money." Upon its release on November 22, 1995, Toy Story managed to gross more than $350 million worldwide. Disney chairman Michael Eisner stated "I don't think either side thought Toy Story would turn out as well as it has. The technology is brilliant, the casting is inspired, and I think the story will touch a nerve. Believe me, when we first agreed to work together, we never thought their first movie would be our 1995 holiday feature, or that they could go public on the strength of it." The film's first five days of domestic release (on Thanksgiving weekend) earned it $39.1 million. Moreover, Toy Story earned a total of $158.6 million from ticket sales combined with the five-day Wednesday opening. It would go on to hold this record until Independence Day took it the next year. The film placed first in the weekend's box office with $29.1 million and maintained the number-one position at the domestic box office for the next two weekends. Toy Story went on to become the highest-grossing domestic film of 1995, beating Batman Forever, Apollo 13 (also starring Tom Hanks), Pocahontas, Casper, Waterworld, and GoldenEye. At the time of its release, it was the third-highest-grossing animated film of all time, after The Lion King (1994) and Aladdin (1992). Toy Story became the second-highest-grossing film of 1995, just $3 million behind Die Hard with a Vengeance. When not considering inflation, Toy Story is number 96 on the list of the highest-grossing domestic films of all time. The film had gross receipts of $192.5 million in the U.S. and Canada and $181.8 million in international markets from its original 1995 release and two re-releases for a total of $374.4 million worldwide. At the time of its release, the film ranked as the 17th-highest-grossing film (unadjusted) domestically and the 21st-highest-grossing film worldwide.

Critical response 
Its critical consensus reads, "Entertaining as it is innovative, Toy Story reinvigorated animation while heralding the arrival of Pixar as a family-friendly force to be reckoned with." Metacritic (which uses a weighted average) assigned Toy Story a score of 95 out of 100 based on 26 critics, indicating "universal acclaim". Audiences polled by CinemaScore gave the film an average grade of "A" on an A+ to F scale.

Particular praise was offered for the film's 3D animation. Leonard Klady of Variety commended its "razzle-dazzle technique and unusual look" and said that "the camera loops and zooms in a dizzying fashion that fairly takes one's breath away." Roger Ebert of the Chicago Sun-Times compared the animation to Disney's Who Framed Roger Rabbit, saying that "both movies take apart the universe of cinematic visuals and put it back together again, allowing us to see in a new way." Due to the film's creative animation, Richard Corliss of TIME claimed that it was "the year's most inventive comedy".

The voice cast was also praised by various critics. Susan Wloszczyna of USA Today approved of the selection of Tom Hanks and Tim Allen for the lead roles. Kenneth Turan of the Los Angeles Times stated that "Starting with Tom Hanks, who brings an invaluable heft and believability to Woody, Toy Story is one of the best voiced animated features in memory, with all the actors ... making their presences strongly felt."

Several critics also recognized the film's ability to appeal to various age groups. Owen Gleiberman of Entertainment Weekly wrote "It has the purity, the ecstatic freedom of imagination, that's the hallmark of the greatest children's films. It also has the kind of spring-loaded allusive prankishness that, at times, will tickle adults even more than it does kids."

In 1995, Toy Story was ranked eighth in TIMEs list of the "Best 10 films of 1995". In 2011, TIME named it one of the "25 All-TIME Best Animated Films".
It also ranks at number 99 in Empire magazine's list of the "500 Greatest Films of All Time" and as the "highest-ranked animated movie".

In 2003, the Online Film Critics Society ranked the film as the greatest animated film of all time. In 2007, the Visual Effects Society named the film 22nd in its list of the "Top 50 Most Influential Visual Effects Films of All Time". The film is ranked 99th on the AFI's list of the "100 greatest American Films of All-Time". It was one of the only two animated films on that list, the other being Snow White and the Seven Dwarfs (1937). It was also the sixth best in the animation genre on AFI's 10 Top 10.

In more recent years, director Terry Gilliam has praised the film as "a work of genius. It got people to understand what toys are about. They're true to their own character. And that's just brilliant. It's got a shot that's always stuck with me when Buzz Lightyear discovers he's a toy. He's sitting on this landing at the top of the staircase and the camera pulls back and he's this tiny little figure. He was this guy with a massive ego two seconds before... and it's stunning. I'd put that as one of my top ten films, period."

Accolades 

The film won and was nominated for various other awards including a Kids' Choice Award, MTV Movie Award, and a British Academy Film Award, among others. John Lasseter received a Special Achievement Academy Award in 1996 "for the development and inspired application of techniques that have made possible the first feature-length computer-animated film". Additionally, the film was nominated for three Academy Awards, two to Randy Newman for Best Music—Original Song, for "You've Got a Friend in Me", and Best Music—Original Musical or Comedy Score. It was also nominated for Best Original Screenplay for the work by Joel Cohen, Pete Docter, John Lasseter, Joe Ranft, Alec Sokolow, Andrew Stanton and Joss Whedon, making it the first animated film to be nominated for an Academy Award writing category.

Toy Story won eight Annie Awards, including Best Animated Feature. Animator Pete Docter, director John Lasseter, musician Randy Newman, producers Bonnie Arnold and Ralph Guggenheim, production designer Ralph Eggleston, and writers Joel Cohen, Alec Sokolow, Andrew Stanton, and Joss Whedon all won awards for Best Individual Achievement in their respective fields for their work on the film. The film also won Best Individual Achievement in technical achievement.

Toy Story was nominated for two Golden Globe Awards, one for Best Motion Picture—Comedy or Musical, and one for Best Original Song—Motion Picture for Newman's "You've Got a Friend in Me". At both the Los Angeles Film Critics Association Awards and the Kansas City Film Critics Circle Awards, the film won "Best Animated Film". Toy Story is also among the top ten in the BFI list of the 50 films you should see by the age of 14, and the highest-placed (at  99) animated film in Empire magazines list of "500 Greatest Movies of All Time". In 2005, Toy Story, along with Toy Story 2 was voted the fourth greatest cartoon in Channel 4's 100 Greatest Cartoons poll, behind The Simpsons, Tom and Jerry, and South Park.

Impact and legacy 
Toy Story had a large impact on the film industry with its innovative computer animation. After the film's debut, various industries were interested in the technology used for the film. Graphics chip makers desired to compute imagery similar to the film's animation for personal computers; game developers wanted to learn how to replicate the animation for video games; and robotics researchers were interested in building artificial intelligence into their machines that compared to the film's lifelike characters. Various authors have also compared the film to an interpretation of Don Quixote as well as humanism. In addition, Toy Story left an impact with its catchphrase "To Infinity and Beyond", sequels, and software, among others. In 2005, Toy Story was selected by the United States Library of Congress to be preserved in the National Film Registry for being "culturally, historically, or aesthetically significant".

"To Infinity... and Beyond!" 
Buzz Lightyear's line "To Infinity and Beyond!" has been used not only on themed merchandise, but among philosophers and mathematical theorists as well. In 2008, during STS-124 astronauts took an action figure of Buzz Lightyear into space on Space Shuttle Discovery as part of an educational experience for students while stressing the catchphrase. The action figure was used for experiments in zero-g. It was reported in 2008 that a father and son had continually repeated the phrase to help them keep track of each other while treading water for 15 hours in the Atlantic Ocean. The phrase occurs in the lyrics of Beyoncé's 2008 song "Single Ladies (Put a Ring on It)", during the bridge. In 2012, the late Capital STEEZ released a song titled "Infinity and Beyond" in reference to the phrase as part of his AmeriKKKan Korruption mixtape.

Disney has also recycled the phrase in homage to Toy Story at least twice. In the "blooper reel" shown during the credits of A Bug's Life, Dave Foley says the line while in character as Flik, and Tim Allen himself repeated his famous line in The Shaggy Dog, in a scene when the titular character jumps off a bridge onto a moving vehicle.

Other influences 
Toy Storys cast of characters forms the basis for the naming of the releases of the Debian computer operating system, from Debian 1.1 Buzz, the first release with a codename, in 1996, to Debian 14 Forky, the most-recently announced future release.

In 2013, Pixar designed a "Gromit Lightyear" sculpture based on the Aardman Animations character Gromit for Gromit Unleashed which sold for £65,000.

Sequels and spin-off 

The sequel, titled Toy Story 2, was released on November 24, 1999. In the film, Woody is stolen by a toy collector, leading Buzz and his friends to launch a rescue mission. Initially, Toy Story 2 was going to be a direct-to-video release, with development beginning in 1996. However, after the cast from Toy Story returned and the story was considered to be better than that of a direct-to-video release, it was announced in 1998 that the sequel would see a theatrical release.

Toy Story 3 was released on June 18, 2010. In the film, Andy's toys are accidentally donated to a day-care center as he prepares to leave for college.

Toy Story 4 was released on June 21, 2019, with most of the main cast returning for the film. In the film, Woody, Buzz, and the rest of the gang get used to living with Bonnie, who creates a new toy named Forky, from recycled materials from school. As they go on a road trip with Bonnie, Woody is also reunited with Bo Peep, and must decide where his loyalties lie.

A spin-off film, Lightyear, was released on June 17, 2022, with Chris Evans portraying the original Buzz Lightyear, upon whom the toy given to Andy in the first film was based.

On February 8, 2023, Disney announced that a fifth Toy Story film is in development.

See also 
 List of films with a 100% rating on Rotten Tomatoes, a film review aggregator website
 List of animated films considered the best
 The Brave Little Toaster
 How the Toys Saved Christmas
 Live Action Toy Story

References

Bibliography

External links 

 Official Disney website
 Official Pixar website
 
 
 
 
 

American animated feature films
 
1995 films
1995 animated films
1990s American animated films
1990s buddy comedy films
1990s children's animated films
1995 computer-animated films
1990s fantasy comedy films
1990s English-language films
3D re-releases
American 3D films
American adventure comedy films
American buddy comedy films
American children's animated adventure films
American children's animated comedy films
American children's animated fantasy films
American computer-animated films
Animated buddy films
Animated films about friendship
Best Animated Feature Annie Award winners
Films scored by Randy Newman
Films about toys
Films adapted into television shows
Films directed by John Lasseter
Films produced by Bonnie Arnold
Pixar animated films
Films with screenplays by Joel Cohen
Films with screenplays by Pete Docter
Films with screenplays by John Lasseter
Films with screenplays by Joe Ranft
Films with screenplays by Alec Sokolow
Films with screenplays by Andrew Stanton
Films with screenplays by Joss Whedon
United States National Film Registry films
Walt Disney Pictures animated films
Films about dolls
1995 directorial debut films
1995 children's films
1995 comedy films
Sentient toys in fiction